Ragged Flag is a record label founded in 2007 by members of the band The Prodigy, and backed by the Cooking Vinyl Group.

See also
 List of record labels

References
 
 The Prodigy Back With A New Label And Album

British independent record labels
Record labels established in 2007
Indie rock record labels
Alternative rock record labels
Electronic music record labels